The General Secretary of the Labour Party is the most senior employee of the British Labour Party, and acts as the non-voting secretary to the National Executive Committee. When there is a vacancy the National Executive Committee selects a provisional replacement, subject to approval at the subsequent party conference.

The post is currently held by David Evans, following Jennie Formby's resignation on 4 May 2020. He was formally confirmed in his role by a card vote at the 2021 Labour Conference on 25th September 2021.

Party structure
The General Secretary heads a staff of around 200 in their two head offices, one in London (formerly Southside, until October 2022) and Labour Central in Newcastle upon Tyne, and in the many local offices around the country. The Scottish and Welsh Labour Parties are headed by their own general secretaries, de facto subordinate to the national general secretary.

The General Secretary is responsible for employing staff; campaign and media strategies; running the party's organisational, constitutional and policy committees; organising the Party Conference; liaison with the Socialist International and Party of European Socialists; ensuring legal and constitutional propriety; preparing literature.

The General Secretary also acts as the Registered Treasurer under the Political Parties, Elections and Referendums Act 2000, responsible for preparing accurate financial statements.

As the Labour Party is an unincorporated association without a separate legal personality, the General Secretary represents the party on behalf of the other members of the Labour Party in any legal matters or actions.

History
The post of Party Secretary was created in 1900 at the birth of the Labour Party. The first holder of that position was Ramsay MacDonald, later Prime Minister. In these early years, the post was a very important one, effectively leading the party outside Parliament. MacDonald and his successor, Arthur Henderson, were both Members of Parliament and for a period were both Chairmen of the Parliamentary Labour Party whilst Party Secretary.

Upon Henderson's retirement in 1934, after the 1931 debacle which had seen MacDonald expelled from the party, it was decided that the position should be separated from the parliamentary party, and power should not be concentrated in the hands of one person. Therefore, Henderson's successor would not be allowed to become a Member of Parliament. This ruled out the strongest contender, Herbert Morrison, and others with parliamentary ambitions. Finally, Jimmy Middleton, assistant secretary since 1903, was chosen. He was a quiet-spoken man and the job lost much of its previous importance. However, the National Executive Committee grew in influence.

During World War II, Morgan Phillips became General Secretary and went on to oversee two general election victories. A Welshman, he had been a miner but was instrumental in widening Labour's appeal to the middle classes. He also built a professional Party, with key employees working on policy development and electoral organisation.

When Len Williams, the General Secretary of the early Wilson years, retired in 1968, he was expected to be replaced by someone younger who could transform the party and lead it to a third successive victory. However, the party chose Harry Nicholas, a long-serving left-wing T&G union figure who would be unlikely to continue to renew and reinvigorate the party. The party lost the 1970 general election.

The 1970s and early-1980s saw developing confrontations between the left and the right in the party. Jim Mortimer and Larry Whitty worked hard to keep the party together after the formation of the Social Democratic Party and the rise of the Militant tendency. Whitty oversaw the reforms of Neil Kinnock and stayed on until the election of Tony Blair as Leader. It would be Tom Sawyer who would put in place Blair's New Labour reforms, with the creation of the National Policy Forum, the change to Clause IV and the perceived erosion of the power of grassroots members. He opened new offices in Millbank and created a highly-professional, media-savvy, youthful staff and Party that worked for Labour's landslide victory in the 1997 general election.

Crucial to this period was the transformation of the party apparatus from an alternative centre of power to the parliamentary leadership (largely a product of the 1970s when the party conference repeatedly disowned government policy), to being more congruent with the leadership's ideas for progress.
In fact, the roots of the transformation probably date back to the appointment of Peter Mandelson as the party's communication director in 1985, but under Blair (and Sawyer) rapidly accelerated.

Margaret McDonagh became Labour's first permanent female General Secretary in 1998. She had been a rising star and formidable organiser in the run-up to 1997, seen as the key party official responsible for the record landslide victory, but her fearsome style did not endear her to Party members and the left. Her handling of the candidate selection for the 2000 London mayoral election badly damaged her reputation. However, her formidable organisational skills contributed to a second victory in 2001. McDonagh left after the 2001 general election victory and was succeeded by David Triesman. The party moved in 2004 to appoint Matt Carter as the youngest-ever General Secretary. He resigned after less than two years following the less than convincing 2005 general election victory and was replaced in January 2006 by Peter Watt. Watt became embroiled in the funding scandals of 2007 and resigned soon after.

In early 2008 David Pitt-Watson, a key Gordon Brown ally, was selected for the post under the banner of party finance reform, but never took up the post "for legal and financial reasons". The poor state of the party's finances following the decision by the leadership of the party to finance the General Election campaign in 2005 by loans meant that the auditors of the party had to inform him that his wealth, after a career partly in the City of London, would be at risk if the party did become bankrupt. Ray Collins was appointed in 2008, and was succeeded by Iain McNicol in 2011. McNicol resigned for the post in early 2018, citing a desire to "pursue new challenges". On 20 March 2018, Jennie Formby was appointed as the General Secretary effective from April 2018. She resigned on 4 May 2020, following the election of Keir Starmer as new Labour leader, saying "now we have a new leadership team it is the right time to step down".

List of General Secretaries
1900–1912: Ramsay MacDonald
1912–1935: Arthur Henderson
1935–1944: James Middleton
1944–1962: Morgan Phillips
1962–1968: Len Williams
1968: Sara Barker (acting)
1968–1972: Harry Nicholas
1972–1982: Ron Hayward
1982–1985: Jim Mortimer
1985–1994: Larry Whitty
1994–1998: Tom Sawyer
1998–2001: Margaret McDonagh
2001–2003: David Triesman
2003–2005: Matt Carter
2005–2007: Peter Watt
2008–2011: Ray Collins
2011–2018: Iain McNicol
2018–2020: Jennie Formby
2020-present: David Evans

Sources
A Short History of the Labour Party, Henry Pelling, 2005,

References

Organisation of the Labour Party (UK)
General secretaries